Gouri Kumar Brahma (20 February 1920 – 29 September 2011) was an academician, literary critic, orator and writer. His works are mainly in Odia and Sanskrit. He was popular for his talks on Jagannath culture and literature of Upendra Bhanja in Odia, English Sanskrit and Hindi. He died at Bhubaneswar.

Early life and family 
Gourikumar's father was Chandrasekhar Brahma and Mother was Savitri Devi. His birthplace was at Prataplaxmanpur village of Bhanjanagar. He got his early education in Ganjam district. He got his post graduate degree from Utkal University.While he was a student he studied classical literatures in Odia as well as Sanskrit such as Amarakosha, Kumara Sambhavam, Raghuvaṃśa, Meghadutam, Shishupala Vadha, Kirātārjunīya, Shiddhanta Darpana, Geeta Govinda, Bhagabata, Saptachandi. He was married to Satyabhama, daughter of Poet Godabarish Mohapatra.

Career
He served as a teacher for some time at kazipur and Digapahandi. He worked as a lecturer in Odia. He also served as Odisha Sahitya Akademi, Odisha Sangita nataka Akademi and Odisha Lalitakala Akademi. He served as deputy Director of Department of Culture and Tourism, Government Of Odisha. he also served as chief tourism adviser to Government of Odisha. He retired as a Reader of Odia at Ravenshaw College.
Throughout his career he wrote a number of critiques, interpretations on Odia literature such as on works of Upendra Bhanja , Abhimanyu Samanta Sinhara and others. He has been described as a "incomparable orator". He has been given epithets such as Purusha Saraswati, Sahitya Martanda, Kabi Kokila, Utkala Vachaspati.

Awards
 Utkal Ratna, 2007
 Atibadi Jagannath Das Samman, 1998
 Odisha Sahitya Akademi Award 
 Sarala Sammana

Bibliography

References

1920 births
2011 deaths
People from Ganjam district
Writers from Odisha
Odia-language writers
Recipients of the Atibadi Jagannath Das Award
20th-century Indian male writers